Fan Xu may refer to:

Fan Xu, a disciple of Confucius
Xu Fan, a Chinese actress